José Joachim de Sá Freire Alvim (1909–1981) was a Brazilian mayor of the Distrito Federal of Rio de Janeiro from 1958 to 1960.

References
 ABREU, Alzira Alves de; BELOCH, Israel (coords.). Dicionário histórico-biográfico brasileiro (vol. 1, 1930-1983). Rio de Janeiro: Forense-Universitária; FGV-CPDOC; Finep, 1984.
 OLIVEIRA REIS, José de. O Rio de Janeiro e seus prefeitos, evolução urbanística da cidade (vol. 3). Rio de Janeiro: Prefeitura da Cidade do Rio de Janeiro, s.d..

Mayors of Rio de Janeiro (city)
State governors of Brazil
1909 births
1981 deaths